Nag Ashwin Reddy is an Indian film director and screenwriter known for his works in Telugu cinema. He made his directorial debut in 2015 with the coming-of-age philosophical drama film Yevade Subramanyam.

In 2018, he directed the biographical film Mahanati, starring Keerthy Suresh as yesteryear actress Savitri. At the 66th National Film Awards 2019, the film won accolades including the Best Feature Film in Telugu. Nag Ashwin received the Filmfare Award for Best Director – Telugu at the 66th Filmfare Awards South.

Mahanati was showcased in the Indian Panorama Mainstream section at the 49th International Film Festival of India, and has also garnered the "Equality in Cinema Award" at the 2018 Indian Film Festival of Melbourne.

Early life 
Nag Ashwin was born in Hyderabad to Jayaram and Jayanthi Reddy, both of whom are doctors and he has a sister Nikhila Reddy. He studied in Hyderabad Public School and received bachelor's degree in Mass Communication from MIC, Manipal. He then did a Film Direction course at the New York Film Academy.

Career

Nag Ashwin began his film industry career as an assistant director for the film Nenu Meeku Telusa...?. He has then worked as an assistant director with Sekhar Kammula for the films Leader and Life Is Beautiful.

For his third film, Ashwin is teaming up with Amitabh Bachchan, Prabhas, and Deepika Padukone for the first time. It will be produced and presented by Vyjayanthi Movies and Swapna Cinema respectively.

Personal life
In December 2015, Ashwin married Priyanka Dutt, daughter of producer C. Ashwini Dutt of Vyjayanthi Movies. The couple has a son.

Filmography 

 All films are in Telugu, unless noted otherwise.

Awards and nominations

References

External links
 
 

Telugu film directors
Year of birth missing (living people)
Living people
Film directors from Hyderabad, India
Screenwriters from Hyderabad, India
Indian male screenwriters
Filmfare Awards South winners
21st-century Indian film directors
New York Film Academy alumni